The Church of St. Elizabeth of Hungary is a Roman Catholic parish church in the Roman Catholic Archdiocese of New York, located at 211 East 83rd Street, between Second and Third Avenues, on the Upper East Side of Manhattan, New York City.

History 
St. Elizabeth's was founded by Slovakian immigrants on the Lower East Side, with the first Mass celebrated on April 26, 1891, in the basement of St. Bridget's Church on 8th Street and Avenue B. The first church building was located 345 East 4th Street, which hosted its first Mass on August 7, 1892. A special feature of the New York Times in 1901, mentioned the church, listed as "the Hungarian church," among other Catholic structures in the Lower East Side of Manhattan, describing the group "for the most part...limit[ing] themselves to the functions of a parish church, in districts where social needs are otherwise supplied." Without comment on other facilities attached.

As parishioners relocated, it became necessary to move the parish. The former Second Emmanuel Lutheran Church church on East 83rd Street, built in 1892, became the new home for St. Elizabeth's on June 7, 1917. It underwent several expansions in the following decades.

As the local Slovak population declined later in the 20th century, Cardinal Cooke redesignated it as a church for the deaf Catholics of New York on July 1, 1980.

In November 2014, the Archdiocese announced that the Church of St. Elizabeth of Hungary was one of 31 neighborhood parishes which would be merged into other parishes. St. Elizabeth of Hungary and St. Stephen of Hungary were to be merged into the Church of St. Monica at 413 East 79th Street.

The Archdiocese of New York issued a decree to close the church on June 30, 2017, but that decision, along with the earlier decision to merge, were appealed to the Vatican by parishioners and are still pending as of 202.. The church had earlier been considered for, but did not receive, landmark status from the New York City Landmarks Preservation Commission.

Building
The AIA Guide to NYC (Fifth Edition, 2010), neglects to mention an architect, describing the Gothic Revival church as "a classy, spired neo-Gothic exterior, but the treat is within: ascent the stairs to view a just heavenly groin-vaulted ceiling painted in the colors of Ravenna's mosaics."

References

External links 
 Church of Saint Elizabeth of Hungary official site

Religious organizations established in 1887
Roman Catholic churches completed in 1918
Roman Catholic churches in Manhattan
Gothic Revival church buildings in New York City
Slovak-American culture in New York (state)
Upper East Side
1887 establishments in New York (state)
20th-century Roman Catholic church buildings in the United States